Karan Atul Sawhney (born 23 March 1992) is an Indian professional footballer who last played as a striker for Kerala Blasters.

Career

Early career
Born in Mumbai, Maharashtra, Sawhney started his career in the youth set-up of Mahindra United, for which he was a part of the under-15 and under-19 teams. He then moved on to the youth set-up of PIFA where his most memorable moment was when he scored against the Inter Milan Academy side in the 2009 Gauteng Future Champions tournament. After his time at PIFA, Sawhney joined the Tata Football Academy where he graduated in 2012.

Salgaocar
On 7 June 2012 it was confirmed that Sawhney had signed for Salgaocar of the I-League. Then in 2013 it was confirmed that Sawhney had been loaned out to DSK Shivajians F.C. for their I-League 2nd Division campaign.

Bengaluru FC
On 20 July 2013 it was announced that Sawhney has signed for Bengaluru FC for the 2013–14 I-League campaign. He then made his professional debut for the team on 6 December 2013 against Churchill Brothers at the Duler Stadium. He came on as an 85th-minute substitute for Sunil Chhetri as Bengaluru FC went on to win the match 3–1.

Mumbai
On 6 January 2016 it was announced that Sawhney had signed with Mumbai.

Kerala Blasters
On 23 July 2017, Sawhney was selected in the 14th round of the 2017–18 ISL Players Draft by the Kerala Blasters for the 2017–18 Indian Super League season. He made his debut for the club on 9 December 2017 against Goa. He came on as a 62nd-minute substitute for Loken Meitei as Kerala Blasters lost 5–2.

Career statistics

References

External links 
 I-League Profile.
 Bengaluru FC Profile.

1992 births
Living people
Footballers from Mumbai
Indian footballers
Salgaocar FC players
DSK Shivajians FC players
Bengaluru FC players
Mumbai FC players
Kerala Blasters FC players
Association football forwards
I-League players
I-League 2nd Division players
Indian Super League players